Haruniyeh (also Romanized as Hārūnīyeh and Harūnīeh; also known as Gol Lar, Harūnābād, and Hūrlān) is a village in Mishu-e Jonubi Rural District, Sufian District, Shabestar County, East Azerbaijan Province, Iran. At the 2006 census, its population was 193, in 52 families.

References 

Populated places in Shabestar County